Hugh de Lacy may refer to:

Hugh de Lacy, Lord of Lassy (c.1020–1085), first recorded member of the Norman noble family de Lacy
Hugh de Lacy, Lord of Meath (died 1186), 4th Baron Lacy
Hugh de Lacy, Abbot of Shrewsbury (died c. 1215/18)
Hugh de Lacy, 1st Earl of Ulster (c. 1176–1242), younger son of Hugh de Lacy, Lord of Meath
Hugh Lacy (1943–1998), 3rd Baronet of the Lacy baronets
Hugh Lacy (bishop) (died 1580), Anglican bishop in Ireland 
Hugh De Lacy (politician) (1910–1986), American politician